Grenadier Island  may refer to:
 Grenadier Island, New York
 Grenadier Island (Saint Lawrence River) in Ontario